Sunita Marshall is a Pakistani fashion model and television actress. She is best known for her roles in ARY Digital political drama series Mera Saaein and Geo Entertainment drama series Khuda Aur Muhabbat 3. As a model Marshall has extensive career and has been nominated for several awards including Lux Style Award for Best Model - Female and Hum Award for Best Model Female at 4th Hum Awards.

Early life and personal life
Marshall was born in Dubai on April 9, 1981. She graduated from St. Patrick's College in commerce. In 2009, she married her co-star and model Hassan Ahmed in an Islamic wedding and Catholic wedding, due to her Christian beliefs. The couple have two children, one boy Raakin Ahmed and girl named Zynah Ahmed.

Career
She has worked in Mera Saaein and reprise her role in sequel Mera Saaein 2. She regularly appears at PFDC Sunsilk Fashion Week. She also made a guest appearance of Shehla in Hum TV's serial, Dil-e-Beqarar. She also has a nephew named Zion Marshall.

Filmography

Television

Anthology Series

Telefilm

Other appearances
Jago Pakistan Jago
Nestle Nido Young Stars (2015)
Iftar Mulaqat (2016) 
Mazaaq Raat (2017)

Awards and nominations
 7th Lux Style Awards - Lux Style Award for Best Model - Female
 4th Hum Awards - Hum Award for Best Model Female

References

External links
 
 Sunita Marshall Biography

Living people
Pakistani female models
Pakistani television actresses
21st-century Pakistani actresses
1982 births
People from Lahore
Actresses from Lahore
St. Patrick's College (Karachi) alumni
Pakistani Roman Catholics